Seghayesh (also Romanized as Şeghāyesh) is a village in Yengejeh Rural District, Howmeh District, Azarshahr County, East Azerbaijan Province, Iran. At the 2006 census, its population was 660, in 159 families.

References 

Populated places in Azarshahr County